1988 in sports describes the year's events in world sport.

Alpine skiing
 Alpine Skiing World Cup
 Men's overall season champion: Pirmin Zurbriggen, Switzerland
 Women's overall season champion: Michela Figini, Switzerland

American football
 Super Bowl XXII –  the Washington Redskins (NFC) won 42–10 over the Denver Broncos (AFC)
Location: Jack Murphy Stadium
Attendance: 73,302
MVP: Doug Williams, QB (Washington)
Williams becomes the first black quarterback to play in a Super Bowl.
 December 17 – Jamie Morris of Washington Redskins sets NFL single game record for rushing attempts (45) in 20–17 loss to Cincinnati Bengals.
 January 1 – Orange Bowl (1987 season):
 The Miami Hurricanes won 20-14 over the Oklahoma Sooners to win the national championship

Association football

Athletics
 September – Athletics at the 1988 Summer Olympics held in Seoul, South Korea

Australian rules football
 Victorian Football League
 Hawthorn wins the 92nd VFL Premiership (Hawthorn 22.20 (152) d Melbourne 6.20 (56))
 Brownlow Medal awarded to Gerard Healy (Sydney Swans)

Baseball
 January 12 – Former Pirates slugger Willie Stargell is the only player elected to the Baseball Hall of Fame. Stargell, leader of two world champions in Pittsburgh and NL co-MVP in 1979 at age 39, becomes the 17th player to be elected in his first year of eligibility. Jim Bunning falls four votes shy of the 321 needed for election in his 13th year on the ballot.
 August 8 – The first night game ever at Wrigley Field is played.  After an attempt the previous night was rained out, the Cubs defeat the New York Mets 6–4.
 World Series – Los Angeles Dodgers won 4 games to 1 over the  Oakland Athletics. The Series MVP was Orel Hershiser, Los Angeles

Basketball
 NCAA Men's Basketball Championship –
 Kansas wins 83–79 over Oklahoma
 NBA Finals –
 Los Angeles Lakers won 4 games to 3 over the Detroit Pistons
 National Basketball League (Australia) Finals:
 Canberra Cannons defeated the North Melbourne Giants 2–1 in the best-of-three final series.

Boxing
 June 6 – in Las Vegas,  Iran Barkley knocked out Thomas Hearns in the 3rd round to win the WBC Middleweight Title.
 June 27 – in what was dubbed Superfight '88 Mike Tyson knocks out Michael Spinks in Atlantic City, New Jersey and defends the Undisputed Heavyweight Championship of the World.
 November 7 – in Las Vegas, boxer Sugar Ray Leonard knocks out Donnie LaLonde.

Canadian football
 Grey Cup – Winnipeg Blue Bombers won 22–21 over the B.C. Lions
 Vanier Cup – Calgary Dinos won 52–23 over the St. Mary's Huskies

Cycling
 Giro d'Italia won by Andrew Hampsten of the United States
 Tour de France – Pedro Delgado of Spain
 UCI Road World Championships – Men's road race – Maurizio Fondriest of Italy

Darts
 Embassy World Professional Darts Championships won by Bob Anderson of England

Dog sledding
 Iditarod Trail Sled Dog Race Champion –
 Susan Butcher wins with lead dogs: Granite & Tolstoi

Field hockey
 Men's Champions Trophy held in Lahore won by West Germany
 Olympic Games (Men's Competition) won by Great Britain

Figure skating
 World Figure Skating Championships –
 Men's champion: Brian Boitano, United States
 Ladies' champion: Katarina Witt, East Germany
 Pair skating champions: Elena Valova / Oleg Vasiliev, Soviet Union
 Ice dancing champions: Natalia Bestemianova / Andrei Bukin, Soviet Union

Gaelic Athletic Association
 Camogie
 All-Ireland Camogie Champion: Kilkenny
 National Camogie League: Kilkenny
 Gaelic football
 All-Ireland Senior Football Championship – Meath 0–13 died Cork 0–9
 National Football League – Meath 2–13 died Dublin 0–11
 Ladies' Gaelic football
 All-Ireland Senior Football Champion: Kerry
 National Football League: Kerry
 Hurling
 All-Ireland Senior Hurling Championship – Galway 1–15 died Tipperary 0–14
 National Hurling League – Tipperary 3–15 beat Offaly 2–9

Golf
Men's professional
 Masters Tournament – Sandy Lyle
 U.S. Open – Curtis Strange
 British Open – Seve Ballesteros
 PGA Championship – Jeff Sluman
 PGA Tour money leader – Curtis Strange – $1,147,644
 Senior PGA Tour money leader – Bob Charles – $533,929
Men's amateur
 British Amateur – Cristian Härdin
 U.S. Amateur – Eric Meeks
 European Amateur – not played
Women's professional
 Nabisco Dinah Shore – Amy Alcott
 LPGA Championship – Sherri Turner
 U.S. Women's Open – Liselotte Neumann
 Classique du Maurier – Sally Little
 LPGA Tour money leader – Sherri Turner – $350,851

Harness racing
 North America Cup – Jate Lobell
 United States Pacing Triple Crown races –
 Cane Pace – Runnymede Lobell
 Little Brown Jug – B.J. Scoot
 Messenger Stakes – Matt's Scooter
 United States Trotting Triple Crown races –
 Hambletonian – Armbro Goal
 Yonkers Trot – Southern Newton
 Kentucky Futurity – Huggie Hanover
 Australian Inter Dominion Harness Racing Championship –
 Pacers: Our Maestro
 Trotters: True Roman

Horse racing
Steeplechases
 Cheltenham Gold Cup – Charter Party
 Grand National – Rhyme 'n' Reason
Flat races
 Australia – Melbourne Cup won by Empire Rose
 Canada – Queen's Plate won by Regal Intention
 France – Prix de l'Arc de Triomphe won by Tony Bin
 Ireland – Irish Derby Stakes won by Kahyasi
 Japan – Japan Cup won by Pay the Butler
 English Triple Crown Races:
 2,000 Guineas Stakes – Doyoun
 The Derby – Kahyasi
 St. Leger Stakes – Minster Son
 United States Triple Crown Races:
 Kentucky Derby – Winning Colors
 Preakness Stakes – Risen Star
 Belmont Stakes – Risen Star
 Breeders' Cup World Thoroughbred Championships:
 Breeders' Cup Classic – Alysheba
 Breeders' Cup Distaff – Personal Ensign
 Breeders' Cup Juvenile – Is It True 
 Breeders' Cup Juvenile Fillies – Open Mind
 Breeders' Cup Mile – Miesque
 Breeders' Cup Sprint – Gulch
 Breeders' Cup Turf – Great Communicator

Ice hockey
 Art Ross Trophy as the NHL's leading scorer during the regular season: Mario Lemieux, Pittsburgh Penguins
 Hart Memorial Trophy for the NHL's Most Valuable Player: Mario Lemieux, Pittsburgh Penguins
 Stanley Cup – Edmonton Oilers won 4 games to 0 over the Boston Bruins
 August 9 – Hockey's Wayne Gretzky traded to the Los Angeles Kings
 World Hockey Championship –
 Men's champion: Soviet Union won the Olympic gold medal
 Junior Men's champion: Canada defeated the USSR
 December 31 – in a game between the Pittsburgh Penguins and New Jersey Devils, Mario Lemieux scores five goals and becomes the only player in NHL history to score a goal in all five possible game situations in the same game: even-strength, power play, shorthanded, penalty shot, and empty net.

Lacrosse
 The New Jersey Saints beat the Washington Wave 17–16 to win the Eagle Pro Box Lacrosse League Championship.
 Following the season, the Eagle Pro Box Lacrosse League changes its name to the Major Indoor Lacrosse League (MILL).
 The Brooklin Redmen win the Mann Cup.
 The Kitchener-Waterloo win the Founders Cup.
 The Esquimalt Legion win the Minto Cup.

Motorsport

Olympic Games
 1988 Summer Olympics takes place in Seoul, South Korea
 USSR wins the most medals (132) and the most gold medals (55).
 September 24 – Canada's Ben Johnson wins Olympic gold in 100 metres. Two days later, he is stripped of the medal after testing positive for a banned substance.
 1988 Winter Olympics takes place in Calgary, Canada
 USSR wins the most medals (29) and the most gold medals (11).

Racewalk
February 19 - Helga Arendt, Silke-Beate Knoll, Mechthild Kluth, Gisela Kinzel walk indoor female world record 4x200 meter (1:32.55)

Radiosport
 Fourth Amateur Radio Direction Finding World Championship held in Beatenberg, Switzerland.

Rugby league
1988 Great Britain Lions tour
1988 New Zealand rugby league season
The 1988 NSWRL season sees the debuts of three new franchises: Brisbane Broncos, Gold Coast Chargers and Newcastle Knights. The Canterbury-Bankstown Bulldogs win their sixth title, defeating Balmain Tigers 24–12 in the Grand Final
1988 Pacific Cup
1988 Panasonic Cup
1987–88 Rugby Football League season / 1988–89 Rugby Football League season
1988 State of Origin series
1985–1988 Rugby League World Cup

Rugby union
 94th Five Nations Championship series is shared by France and Wales

Snooker
 World Snooker Championship – Steve Davis beats Terry Griffiths 18–11
 World rankings – Steve Davis remains world number one for 1988/89

Swimming
 Olympic Games held in Seoul, South Korea (September 18 – September 25)
 March 25 – USA's Tom Jager betters his own world record (22.32) in the 50m freestyle (long course) at a swimming meet in Orlando, Florida,  clocking 22.23.
 September 24 – Matt Biondi breaks Tom Jager's world record (22.23) in the 50m freestyle (long course) in the final of the event at the Seoul Olympic Games,  clocking 22.14.

Tennis
 Grand Slam in tennis men's results:
 Australian Open – Mats Wilander
 French Open – Mats Wilander
 Wimbledon – Stefan Edberg
 U.S. Open – Mats Wilander
 Steffi Graf becomes only the third woman in history to win the Grand Slam in tennis and the golden slam –
 Australian Open – Steffi Graf
 French Open – Steffi Graf
 Wimbledon – Steffi Graf
 U.S. Open – Steffi Graf
 1988 Summer Olympics
 Men's Singles Competition – Miloslav Mečíř
 Women's Singles Competition – Steffi Graf
 Men's Doubles Competition – Ken Flach & Robert Seguso
 Women's Doubles Competition – Pam Shriver & Zina Garrison
 Davis Cup
 Germany won 4–1 over Sweden in world team tennis

Yacht racing
 The San Diego Yacht Club retains the America's Cup as Stars & Stripes '88 defeats New Zealand challenger KZ1, from the Mercury Bay Boating Club, 2 races to 0

Volleyball
 1988 Summer Olympics (men) won by United States of America
 1988 Summer Olympics (women) won by USSR

Water polo
 1988 Summer Olympics (men) won by Yugoslavia

Awards
 Associated Press Male Athlete of the Year – Orel Hershiser, Major League Baseball
 Associated Press Female Athlete of the Year – Florence Griffith Joyner, Track and field

References

 
Sports by year